The Doubles luge competition at the 1998 Winter Olympics in Nagano was held on 13 February, at Spiral.

Results

References

Luge at the 1998 Winter Olympics
Men's events at the 1998 Winter Olympics